Nanyak Dala (born 18 June 1984) is a Canadian rugby union player. His position is flanker, and he has played 14 tests for the Canadian national team. Dala currently plays for Castaway Wanderers RFC in the British Columbia Premiership and with Prairie Wolf Pack in the Canadian Rugby Championship.

Personal life
Dala was born in Jos, Nigeria, but moved to South Africa with his family and took up rugby at age 12. Eventually Dala would go on to represent KwaZulu-Natal provincial teams at various age-grade levels. Dala and his family would eventually move on to the city of North Battleford in Canada where his father, Gideon, sought job opportunities in the medical field. Dala later moved on to Saskatoon to pursue university education at the University of Saskatchewan. In Saskatoon Dala would go on to join local club side, Saskatoon Wild Oats RFC.

References

1984 births
Canadian rugby union players
Canada international rugby union players
Living people
Sportspeople from Jos
Canadian sportspeople of Nigerian descent
University of Saskatchewan alumni
Canada international rugby sevens players
Pan American Games gold medalists for Canada
Pan American Games medalists in rugby sevens
Rugby sevens players at the 2010 Commonwealth Games
Commonwealth Games rugby sevens players of Canada
Rugby sevens players at the 2011 Pan American Games
Prairie Wolf Pack players
Medalists at the 2011 Pan American Games
Nigerian emigrants to Canada